Lorenzo Checchi (born 20 January 1991) is an Italian professional footballer who plays as a centre back for  club Alessandria.

Club career
Formed on Siena academy, Checchi made his senior debut for Borgo a Buggiano on Serie C2.

On 15 July 2016, Checchi joined to Massese.

On 12 July 2017, he moved to Imolese.

On 11 September 2020, he joined to Mantova.

On 24 August 2022, Checchi moved to Alessandria on a two-year contract.

References

External links
 
 

1991 births
Living people
People from Bagno a Ripoli
Sportspeople from the Metropolitan City of Florence
Italian footballers
Association football defenders
Serie C players
Serie D players
A.C.N. Siena 1904 players
U.S. Poggibonsi players
U.S. Massese 1919 players
Imolese Calcio 1919 players
Mantova 1911 players
U.S. Alessandria Calcio 1912 players
Footballers from Tuscany